Hypocalymma hirsutum is a member of the family Myrtaceae endemic to Western Australia.

It blooms between July and October producing yellow flowers.

It is found along the west coast on sand plains in the Mid West and Wheatbelt regions of Western Australia where it grows in sandy lateritic soils.

References

hirsutum
Endemic flora of Western Australia
Rosids of Western Australia
Plants described in 2002
Taxa named by Gregory John Keighery